The Rest on the Flight into Egypt, also called The Rest on the Return from the Flight into Egypt is a circa 1530 oil painting by the Venetian Renaissance painter Paris Bordone. It is on display in the Musée des Beaux-Arts of Strasbourg, France. Its inventory number is 176.

History 
The work was painted around 1530 as an altarpiece for the Benedictine church Santa Maria della Misericordia of Noale (today the parish church Chiesa dell'Assunta). It was bought in London in 1890 by Wilhelm von Bode, from the collection of Charles Fairfax Murray. The painting was restaured in 1965.

Description 
The painting depicts a sleeping Saint Joseph, the babies Jesus and John the Baptist playing with a lamb, and Mary, being approached from the right by an older woman with distinctly "gypsy" features. Some art historians have identified her as Saint Elisabeth, which would account for the presence of John the Baptist and the pictured moment being on the return from Egypt instead of on the way there. It does not, however, explain why Mary would, in that case, have the bewildered gaze and gesture with which Bordone represented her, nor what the solemn and distant attitude of "Elisabeth" would stand for.Another theory states that this woman is a gypsy fortune-teller, announcing the future fate of both boys. Gypsies (Zingari) were a recurring subject in Venetian painting, influenced by Giorgione's famous The Tempest. A 2015 interpretation of the painting claims that it is inspired by the Syriac Infancy Gospel, in which Mary, on her way to Egypt, would frequently be approached by sick people in search of a miraculous healing, which she would always grant them. In that case, the "Gypsy" would be an old Egyptian showing facial symptoms of the plague, a disease of which Paris Bordone was afraid as well.

References 

Paintings in the collection of the Musée des Beaux-Arts de Strasbourg
Renaissance paintings
Italian paintings
1530 paintings
Bordone
Oil on canvas paintings